Ancistrus reisi is a species of catfish in the family Loricariidae. It is a freshwater fish native to South America, where it is known to occur in small rivers in the state of Tocantins in Brazil. The species reaches 6.1 cm (2.4 inches) SL and is distinguished from most members of the genus (except A. tombador and A. jataiensis) by the absence of an adipose fin, which for this species is replaced by a series of unpaired platelets that form a low crest.

References 

Fish described in 2005
reisi